North Filton Platform was a railway station which served the northern part of Filton, Gloucestershire, England. It was on the railway line between Filton and Avonmouth, and was situated on the western side of Gloucester Road (the present A38).

History

The railway line between Stoke Gifford Junction and Holesmouth Junction (Avonmouth), now known as the Henbury Loop Line, was opened by the Great Western Railway (GWR) on 9 May 1910, together with the Filton West Loop (Filton Junction to Filton West Junction). Among the stations on that line which opened the same day was one originally known as Filton Halt. It closed less than five years later, on 22 March 1915.

It was reopened either on 12 July 1926 or on 20 September 1926, and was now known as North Filton Platform.

Regular passenger services ceased from 23 November 1964, but workman trains continued until 12 May 1986.

Reopening
FOSBR suggest this would help services along the Severn Beach Line, allowing a -- service, and also provide services to the north of Bristol generally, the Cribbs Causeway shopping centre, and the redevelopment at Filton Aerodrome. FOSBR say that local councils have committed to a feasibility study into reopening the line. In December 2011 a South Gloucestershire Council planning committee recommended that the station, along with Henbury station, be re-opened for passenger services.

In 2021 a planning application was opened for the new station. It will be built close to Gloucester Road North, and will link in with the proposed Cribbs/Patchway New Neighbourhood development being built by YTL. It will be served by an hourly service between Bristol Temple Meads and Henbury, and will be an unstaffed station. It will have two platforms, connected by a footbridge and lifts ensuring step-free access for all users. Both platforms will have ticket machines and covered waiting areas and the station will have a car park to include spaces for Blue Badge holders as well as general vehicle spaces and cycle parking. The station will be accessible from the north, via a station square, with drop-off spaces as well as locations for rail-replacement buses.

Planning permission was granted in January 2023 with a planned opening date of 2026.

Notes

References

External links
North Filton Platform on navigable O.S. map

Beeching closures in England
Disused railway stations in Bristol, Bath and South Gloucestershire
Filton
Former Great Western Railway stations
Railway stations in Great Britain opened in 1910
Railway stations in Great Britain closed in 1915
Railway stations in Great Britain opened in 1926
Railway stations in Great Britain closed in 1964